Isobel Lucia Freud (born 17 April 1961), better known as Bella Freud, is a London-based fashion designer.

Life and career

Freud was born in London, England. She is the daughter of Bernardine Coverley and artist Lucian Freud, and the great-granddaughter of the inventor of psychoanalysis, Sigmund Freud. Her maternal grandparents were practising Roman Catholics of Irish descent, but her mother was no longer observant, while her father's family were Jewish atheists. She identifies as Jewish.

Her only full sibling is her sister, writer Esther Freud, who wrote the memoir of their hippie childhood in Morocco, Hideous Kinky.

Freud was married to journalist James Fox in 2001. They have a son, James "Jimmy" Lux Fox. The couple separated in 2017.

See also
 Freud family

References

External links
Bella Freud Website

1961 births
English Jews
English people of German-Jewish descent
English people of Irish descent
Fashion designers from London
British women fashion designers
Bella
Living people
Waldorf school alumni